Danepteryx robusta is a species in the family Tropiduchidae ("tropiduchid planthoppers"), in the order Hemiptera ("true bugs, cicadas, hoppers, aphids and allies").
Danepteryx robusta is found in North America.

References

Further reading
 American Insects: A Handbook of the Insects of America North of Mexico, Ross H. Arnett. 2000. CRC Press.
 Metcalf, Z. P. (1958). General Catalogue of the Homoptera, Fascicle IV: Fulgoroidea, part 15: Issidae, 561.

Insects described in 1940
Gaetuliini